The 2007 College Football Hall of Fame inductees were chosen by a ballot which consisted of 75 players and 8 coaches who were voted on by more than twelve-thousand voters for inclusion into the College Football Hall of Fame. The 2007 class was announced at a press conference in New York City at the Waldorf-Astoria Hotel on May 9, 2007, and was inducted at The National Football Foundation’s 50th Awards Dinner on December 4, 2007, also at the Waldorf-Astoria. They were then enshrined into the hall of fame in South Bend, Indiana in the summer of 2008.

Once nominated for consideration, all player candidates were submitted to one of eight District Screening Committees, depending on their geographic location, which conducted a vote to determine who appeared on the ballot and represented their respective districts. Each year, 15 candidates, who are not selected for the Hall of Fame, will be named automatic holdovers and will bypass the district screening process and automatically appear on the ballot the following year.

Joe Paterno was inducted this year as well, despite not being on this ballot. He was voted in on the 2006 ballot but was unable to attend the induction due to a sideline injury.

Inductees
Players
Tom Brahaney, Oklahoma, C
Dave Brown, Michigan, DB
Jeff Davis, Clemson, LB
Doug Flutie, Boston College, QB
Johnnie Johnson, Texas, DB
Rex Kern, Ohio State, QB
Ahmad Rashad, Oregon, RB/WR
Anthony Thompson, Indiana, RB
Wilson Whitley, Houston, DT
Reggie Williams, Dartmouth, LB
Richard Wood, Southern Cal, LB
Chris Zorich, Notre Dame, DT

Coach
Herb Deromedi, Central Michigan

Players
To be eligible for the ballot, players must have:
 Been named a First Team All-America by a major/national selector as recognized and utilized by the NCAA for their consensus All-America teams;
 Played their last year of intercollegiate football at least ten years prior;
 Played within the last 50 years (since 1957 for the 2007 ballot, making three candidates, Don Stephenson, Jim Taylor, and Clendon Thomas their last year eligible to be voted in);
 Cannot be currently playing professional football.

The candidate’s post-football record as a citizen was also weighed.

The University of Notre Dame led this year's ballot with 8 nominations followed by the University of Southern California with 5 and the Ohio State University and University of Oklahoma tied with 3 each.

Coaches
To be eligible for the ballot, coaches must have:
 Coached a minimum of 10 years and 100 games as a head coach;
 Won at least 60% (.600+) of their games;
 Be retired from coaching or over the age of 75.

The candidate’s post-football record as a citizen was also weighed.

Jim Donnan led the 2007 ballot with the highest winning percentage (.722). However, John Cooper had the most wins (193) and most seasons as head coach (24). Herb Deromedi had the longest tenure at one school with 16 years at Central Michigan University.

Sources
 2007 Ballot for College Football Hall of Fame Announced, 2007-03-11, accessed 2007-03-21

Footnotes

College Football Hall of Fame
2007 sports awards